Jawan Muhabat is a 1971 Bollywood romance film directed by Bhappi Sonie. The film stars Shammi Kapoor, Asha Parekh in lead roles. Filming began on March 19, 1965, and it took several years before the film was released in 1971.

Cast
Shammi Kapoor as Rajesh Sareen
Asha Parekh as Komal Mathur
Balraj Sahani as Dr. Naresh Sareen
Nirupa Roy as Mrs. Sunita Sareen
Shashikala as Mala 
Pran as Vinod
Raj Mehra as DIG Mathur
Rajendra Nath as Tommy
Sarika as Rekha

Plot 
Dr. Sareen lives with his wife, Sunita, young daughter, Rekha, and his brother, Rajesh. Rajesh is an eligible bachelor and on the lookout for a life-partner with a view of marriage. One day, Dr. Sareen gets a visitor from his past, namely a beautiful young woman named Mala, with whom he had an affair and was even married to for a short period of time. Sareen finds out that he is still attracted to Mala, and is lured into her world - full of deception, deceit and death.

Soundtrack
All songs composed by Shankar–Jaikishan and Lyrics by Hasrat Jaipuri and Rajendra Krishan

External links
 

1971 films
1970s Hindi-language films
1970s romance films
Films scored by Shankar–Jaikishan
Films directed by Bhappi Sonie
Indian romance films
Hindi-language romance films